Jow Kanak is a village in Howmeh-ye Sharqi Rural District, in the Central District of Ramhormoz County, Khuzestan Province, Iran. At the 2006 census, its population was 152, in 24 families. Jow Kanak is one of the oldest villages in Ramhormoz.

Jow Kanak bridge is located in Jow Kanak village, 6 kilometers from Rudzard and 22 kilometers from Ramhormoz city. The bridge was established in 1370. Its colour is rusty bronze. The foundations of this bridge are 5 meters below the ground.

The local dialect of Jow Kanak is a dialect of the Lori language.

Gallery

References

External links 

Populated places in Ramhormoz County